Zonular cataract and nystagmus, also referred as nystagmus with congenital zonular cataract, is a rare congenital disease associated with Nystagmus and zonular cataract of the eye.

Genetics
It has been suggested that the disease follows an X-linked pattern of inheritance though studies done on this particular disease are few.

Diagnosis

Treatment

References

External links 

Congenital disorders of eyes
Genetic disorders with OMIM but no gene